Parenty is a commune in the Pas-de-Calais department in the Hauts-de-France region of France.

Geography
Parenty lies about 10 miles (16 km) north of Montreuil-sur-Mer, on the D127.

Population

Places of interest
 Vestiges of a Merovingian cemetery
 The Château, dated 1785
 Manorhouse of Parenty
 Manorhouse at Hodicq
 Manorhouse at Annezy
 A feudal motte
 Chapel of Saint-Eloi at Herimetz.
 The sixteenth century church of St. Wulmer

See also
Communes of the Pas-de-Calais department

References

Communes of Pas-de-Calais